The Scânteia is a right tributary of the river Miletin in Romania. It flows into the Miletin in Prăjeni.

References

Rivers of Romania
Rivers of Botoșani County
Rivers of Iași County